Vasileios Stavrinos (born 1 May 1907, date of death unknown) was a Greek sprinter. He competed in the men's 400 metres at the 1928 Summer Olympics. He also entered the men's 800 metres event, but finished in 6th place in the first heat behind Belgium's Gerard Bertheloot.

References

External links
 

1907 births
Year of death missing
Athletes (track and field) at the 1928 Summer Olympics
Greek male sprinters
Greek male middle-distance runners
Olympic athletes of Greece
Sportspeople from Istanbul
Constantinopolitan Greeks
Emigrants from the Ottoman Empire to Greece